David Lischka (born 15 August 1997) is a Czech professional footballer who plays as a defender for Baník Ostrava.

Career
In July 2019, he joined Sparta Prague on a three-year contract. In January 2022 Lischka joined Baník Ostrava on a four-and-a-half-year contract.

Honours
Individual
 Czech Talent of the Year: 2018

References

External links

Living people
1997 births
Association football defenders
Czech footballers
Czech Republic youth international footballers
Czech Republic under-21 international footballers
Czech First League players
FC Baník Ostrava players
FC Hlučín players
FK Jablonec players
FK Varnsdorf players
MFK Karviná players
AC Sparta Prague players
Czech National Football League players